Leila Effat Farzad (born 1983) is a British actress. She is known for her role as Naomi Jones in the Sky Atlantic series I Hate Suzie (2020–2022), which earned her a British Academy Television Award nomination.

Early life and education
Farzad was born in London to Iranian parents. She was inspired to pursue acting by National Theatre productions her aunt took her to see, however, her parents requested she get a degree from Oxbridge first. She first studied Modern Languages at Worcester College, Oxford, graduating with a Bachelor of Arts in French and Italian Literature. She then went on to train at the Guildhall School of Music and Drama, which she said "felt like home".

Career 
Farzad began her career with a voice role in the third and fourth series of the Channel 5 animated children's series Peppa Pig. She made her live action television debut in an episode of the ITV police procedural Law & Order: UK and her professional stage debut as the titular role in Miriam. Gonzalez. Durantez. at Theatre503. This was followed by roles in Blue Remembered Hills at Chichester Festival Theatre, the all female Julius Caesar at the Bridge Theatre in London, Richard II at Shakespeare's Globe. She also appeared in the ITV anthology Innocent.

Farzad landed her first main role was I Hate Suzie as Naomi Jones, Suzie's (Billie Piper) manager and friend. The series was released in 2020 on Sky Atlantic and HBO Max to critical acclaim, and Farzad was nominated for the British Academy Television Award for Best Supporting Actress. Farzad reprised her role in I Hate Suzie'''s second installment titled I Hate Suzie Too in 2022. Also that year, Farzad joined the cast of Avenue 5 for its second season and appeared alongside Josh Hartnett in The Fear Index, also on Sky. In 2023, she starred in the BBC crime drama Better''.

Personal life
Farzad has a daughter (b. 2014) with James Maizels.

Filmography

Stage

Awards and nominations

References

External links

Living people
1982 births
Actresses from London
Alumni of the Guildhall School of Music and Drama
Alumni of Worcester College, Oxford
British actresses of Asian descent
English people of Iranian descent
English television actresses
English voice actresses
People from the City of Westminster